Lake Morat  or Lake Murten is a lake located in the cantons of Fribourg and Vaud in the west of Switzerland. It is named after the small bilingual town of Murten/Morat on its southern shore.

It is the smallest of the three lakes in the Seeland or Pays des trois lacs area of the Swiss plateau located at the foot of the first chain of the Jura mountains. The main tributary is the river Broye.

Since the Jura water correction its water leaves the lake through the Broye Canal (Canal de la Broye)  into nearby Lake Neuchâtel that is connected to Lake Bienne/Lake Biel through the Thielle canal.  Thus all three lakes form a natural reservoir in order to retain overflow water from the river Aare that flows into Lake Bienne/Biel: in times of combined heavy rainfalls and glacier  
melting in the Alps, the peculiar situation arises that the water flows backwards through the Thielle and Broye canals, preventing an overflow of the Grand Marais.

Notes

External links

Waterlevels of Lake Morat at Morat

Morat
Morat
Morat
LMorat
Fribourg–Vaud border